General Ved Prakash Malik PVSM, AVSM (born 1 November 1939) served as the 19th Chief of Army Staff of the Indian Army from 30 September 1997 to 30 September 2000. He was the Army Chief during the Kargil War.

Honours and decorations

Dates of rank

Advisor
Currently, he is a member of the Board of Advisors of India's International Movement to Unite Nations (I.I.M.U.N.).

Publications 

 Kargil: From Surprise to Victory. HarperCollins. 2010. 
 Operation Cactus: Drama in the Maldives. HarperCollins. 2013.

References

External links
 http://www.bharat-rakshak.com/LAND-FORCES/Personnel/Chiefs/160-VP-Malik.html
 http://indianarmy.nic.in/Site/FormTemplete/frmTemp1PTC2C.aspx?MnId=ihbKIDcaeOhOyg5bsE8Dzw&ParentID=BXy2wClT6S80HuIzDoV4qw

1939 births
Living people
Chiefs of Army Staff (India)
People from Dera Ismail Khan District
People from Panchkula
Recipients of the Param Vishisht Seva Medal
Vice Chiefs of Army Staff (India)
Indian generals
National Defence College, India alumni
Recipients of the Ati Vishisht Seva Medal
Commandants of Defence Services Staff College